The House of Nádasdy, also spelled Nadasdy in English, is a major Hungarian aristocratic family whose roots reach into the Middle Ages. Their motto is: "SI DEUS PRO NOBIS QUIS CONTRA NOS" ("If God is for us, who can be against us?"). The Nadasdy family made a large contribution to the development of Hungarian printing. The Nadasdy Hussars, a regiment named after the family, developed a strategy incorporating lightly armed and fast-moving cavalry that was internationally adopted.

Early history
The name is first encountered in the early part of the 13th century, that of Imre (descendant of Darabos de Nádasd) and his sons, Stefánd, Tódor, and Valkomer. Another important member, deceased before 1275, was Simon Nádasdy. Frequently mentioned in family records between 1324 and 1376 is Pető Gersei, who was married to Margit Hidvégi, is considered the progenitor of the family "Pethő de Gerse". In 1229, Petan sold most of his land to a member of the family Nádasdy. The buyer and his three sons, Vencel/Venceslav, Raszló/Vraslav and László/Ladislav, now partially used the predicate of Pethenegh. Laszlo Nádasdy of Pethenegh (c. 1236) is the progenitor of main line Nádasdy.

Notable family members
Baron Tamás I Nádasdy (1498–1562), was Palatine of Hungary and the Ban of Croatia. 
Ferenc Nádasdy II (the "Black Captain"), a general and the son of Tamás I Nádasdy, married Countess Elizabeth Báthory.
Franz III. Nádasdy (d. 1671), grandson of Ferenc Nádasdy II, was a Judge royal, high steward (Hofrichter) of Hungary, and imperial privy councillor, executed in Magnate conspiracy; he created one of the most notable libraries and private art collections in central Europe.
Franz Leopold von Nádasdy (1708–1783), was an Austrian field marshal, and Ban of Croatia.
Ferenc Nádasdy (cultural preservationist) (1937–2013), the last direct male member of the family.
Borbála Nádasdy (1939–present) is a ballet master and author who currently lives in France.

Holdings
Of its many holdings, the family held the Nádasdy Castle in Sárvár, Hungary, the Csejte Castle, in Čachtice, Slovakia which is situated on a hill adjacent to a nature reserve, and the Nádasdy Castle in Nádasdladány, Hungary.

Family members

See also
List of titled noble families in the Kingdom of Hungary

References

 
Hungarian nobility